The following list of Carnegie libraries in North Carolina provides detailed information on United States Carnegie libraries in North Carolina, where 10 public libraries were built from 9 grants (totaling $165,696) awarded by the Carnegie Corporation of New York from 1901 to 1917. In addition, academic libraries were built at 6 institutions (totaling $127,868).

Key

Public libraries

Academic libraries

Notes

References

Note: The above references, while all authoritative, are not entirely mutually consistent. Some details of this list may have been drawn from one of the references without support from the others.  Reader discretion is advised.

North Carolina
Libraries
 
Libraries